John Henry Matthew Reilly (November 11, 1934 – January 9, 2021) was an American film and television actor who appeared on soap operas, including General Hospital, Sunset Beach, and Passions.

Career
Born in Chicago, Illinois, Reilly began acting in the mid 1960s with guest starring roles on Death Valley Days, Apple's Way and Gunsmoke. In 1974, he replaced John Colenback as Dr. Dan Stewart on As the World Turns. After a two and a half year run, he left As the World Turns in September 1976 and was replaced by his predecessor John Colenback. Airing March 12, 1977, he appeared on, The Mary Tyler Moore Show, in the episode, Lou Dates Mary. He also made two guest appearances on The Bionic Woman in 1977 and 1978, and had roles in the 1978 television movies Lassie: A New Beginning and Secrets of Three Hungry Wives. In addition to television, Reilly also appeared in feature films including The Main Event (1979) and Gorp (1980).

In 1983, Reilly had a recurring role on nighttime soap opera Dallas. The following year, he was cast as WSB agent Sean Donely on General Hospital. He stayed with the series until November 1994 when he opted not to renew his contract because of a pay-out from then-executive producer Wendy Riche. His character was written out of the show in February 1995, when Sean and his on screen wife Tiffany left town. He returned to daytime television as Del Douglas on Sunset Beach for a short-term guest role during the show's first six episodes, and then later returned on various occasions during 1997-1999.

Reilly played Kelly Taylor's oft-absentee father, Bill, in several episodes of Beverly Hills, 90210. The character left the canvas when Bill Taylor was arrested and sent to jail, following a reconciliation with his daughter.

On January 21, 2005, Reilly took over the role of Alistair Crane on the NBC soap opera Passions. He took over the role from David Bailey after Bailey died in a pool accident in November 2004. In July 2006, Reilly was dropped from the show as a result of budget cuts. He returned to the role in August 2007 as a recurring character and remained with the show until his character was killed off in May 2008.

On October 21, 2008, Reilly reprised the role of Sean Donely on General Hospital: Night Shift for the second-season finale. On August 9, 2013, Reilly reprised the role of Sean Donely on General Hospital for the 50th anniversary year.

Personal life
On January 9, 2021, his daughter, Caitlin, announced via Instagram that her father had died the same day. The cause of death was a heart attack. He was survived by his wife Liz, five daughters, including Caitlin, who is also an actress and a social media personality, and two grandchildren.

Filmography

Film

Television

Theme parks

Awards nominations

References

External links
John Reilly profile

1934 births
2021 deaths
20th-century American male actors
21st-century American male actors
American male film actors
American male soap opera actors
American male television actors
Male actors from Chicago